is a Japanese actress, voice actress, singer and a former member of the girl group Lisp.

Career
She worked for Voice & Heart until 2007 and has worked for 81 Produce since 2008. She won the Best Lead Actress Award in the 7th Seiyu Awards.

Personal life
On January 14, 2014, Asumi announced her marriage on her blog.  In 2022 she announced the birth of her first child from her Twitter account.

Filmography

Anime television series
2005
Canvas 2: Nijiiro no Sketch – Waitress (ep 3), Choir member (ep 21)

2007
 Hidamari Sketch – Yuno
 Tengen Toppa Gurren Lagann – Kiyal
 Shinkyoku Sōkai Polyphonica – Policewoman Kusunome (ep 11)
 Bokurano – Kana Ushiro
 Shugo Chara! – Ran
 Prism Ark – Bridget

2008
 Rosario + Vampire – Sumae Mizuno (ep 11)
 Persona -trinity soul- – Megumi Kayano
 Aria the Origination – Anzu (ep 4)
 Sekirei – Yukari Sahashi
 Rosario + Vampire Capu2 – Sumae Mizuno
 Toradora! – Sakura Kanō
 Hell Girl: Three Vessels – Shina Tamayo
 Shugo Chara!! Doki— – Ran
 Kyo no Go no Ni – Natsumi Hirakawa
 Hidamari Sketch x365 – Yuno

2009
 Hayate no Gotoku Season 2 – Fumi Hibino, Shiranui
 Kämpfer – Mikoto Kondou
 Umi Monogatari: Anata ga Ite Kureta Koto – Marin
 A Certain Magical Index – Hyoka Kazakiri
 Shugo Chara Party! – Ran
 Saint Seiya: The Lost Canvas – Agasha

2010
 Hidamari Sketch Hoshimittsu – Yuno
 Tales of Phantasia: Narikiri Dungeon X – Mel
 Angel Beats! – Irie
 Working!! – Popura Taneshima
 Maid Sama! – Honoka
 Amagami SS – Miya Tachibana
 Black Rock Shooter – Yuu/STRength
 MM! – Shizuka Sado
 Tamayura – Kaoru Hanawa
 Haiyoru! Nyaruani – Nyaruko
 Haiyoru! Nyaruani: Remember my Mr. Lovecraft – Nyaruko
 The World God Only Knows – Chihiro Kosaka
 Nura: Rise of the Yokai Clan – Saori Maki

2011
 Astarotte no Omocha – Dora
 C³ – Kana Miyama
 Dog Days – Yukikaze Panetone
 Hidamari Sketch x SP – Yuno
 Jormungand – Liliane
 Kämpfer fur die Liebe – Mikoto Kondou
 Mayo Chiki! – Nakuru Narumi
 Nura: Rise of the Yokai Clan: Demon Capital – Saori Maki
 Nurse Love Syndrome - Kaori Sawai
 Pretty Rhythm: Aurora Dream – Aira Harune
 Tamayura: Hitotose – Kaoru Hanawa
 The World God Only Knows II – Chihiro Kosaka
 A Certain Magical Index II – Hyoka Kazakiri
 Working'!! – Popura Taneshima

2012
 Amagami SS+ plus – Miya Tachibana
 Black Rock Shooter – Yū Kōtari, Strength
 Busou Shinki Moon Angel – Arnval Mk.2/Kaguya/01
 Busou Shinki Anime television series – Arnval Mk.2/Ann
 Medaka Box Abnormal – Mizō Yukuhashi
 Dog Days' – Yukikaze Panetone
 Haiyore! Nyaruko-san – Nyarlathotep/Nyaruko
 Hayate no Gotoku! Can't Take My Eyes Off You – Fumi Hibino
 Pretty Rhythm: Dear My Future – Aira Harune
 Hidamari Sketch Honeycomb – Yuno
 Ebiten: Kōritsu Ebisugawa Kōkō Tenmonbu – Todayama Kyouko
 Waiting in the Summer – Mio Kitahara

2013
 Dog & Scissors – Madoka Harumi
 Devil Survivor 2: The Animation – Airi Ban
 Haiyore! Nyaruko-san W – Nyaruko
 Sasami-san@Ganbaranai – Sasami Tsukuyomi
 Encouragement of Climb – Hinata Kuraue
 Magi: The Labyrinth of Magic – Toto
 Hayate no Gotoku! Cuties – Fumi Hibino
 Gargantia on the Verdurous Planet – Melty
 Boku-no-imoutowa"Osaka-okan" – Namika Ishihara
 Hyperdimension Neptunia: The Animation – White Heart/Blanc
 The World God Only Knows: Goddess Saga – Chihiro Kosaka
 Puella Magi Madoka Magica the Movie: Rebellion – Nagisa Momoe
 Hidamari Sketch: Sae & Hiro's Graduation Arc – Yuno
 Non Non Biyori – Komari Koshigaya
 Unbreakable Machine-Doll – Frey
 Wanna Be the Strongest in the World – Elena Miyazawa

2014
 If Her Flag Breaks – Kikuno Shōkanji
 Nisekoi – Marika Tachibana
 Mekakucity Actors – Ene/Takane Enomoto
 Nanana's Buried Treasure – Tensai Ikkyū
 Strike the Blood – Reina Akatsuki 
 Girl Friend Beta – Michiru Tomura
 Witch Craft Works – Touko Hio
 Pretty Rhythm: All-Star Selection – Aira Harune
 Encouragement of Climb: Second Season – Hinata Kuraue
 Kamigami no Asobi – Balder Hringhorni (young)
 Hanamonogatari – Numachi Rōka

2015
 Classroom Crisis – Yuna Nouen
 Cross Ange – Aura Midgardia
 Dog Days" – Yukikaze Panetone
 Haiyore! Nyaruko-san F – Nyaruko
 Magical Girl Lyrical Nanoha ViVid – Chantez Arpinion
 Miss Monochrome: The Animation 2 – Yayoi Konno
 Nisekoi: – Marika Tachibana
 Non Non Biyori Repeat – Komari Koshigaya
 Star-Myu: High School Star Musical – Yuki Nayuki
 Working!!! – Popura Taneshima

2016
 Divine Gate – Sylph
 Nisekoi: OVA – Marika Tachibana
 High School Fleet – Minami Kaburagi
 Love Live! Sunshine!! – Shima Takami
 Regalia: The Three Sacred Stars – Noa Kleis

2017
 Kamiwaza Wanda - Amazing
 Pretty Cure Dream Stars! – Sakura
 Star-Myu: High School Star Musical 2 – Yuki Nayuki

2018
 Kiratto Pri Chan – Aira Nanahoshi
 Island – Karen Kurutsu
 Grand Blue – Aina Yoshiwara
 Senran Kagura: Shinovi Master – Fubuki
 Encouragement of Climb: Third Season – Hinata Kuraue

2019
 Boogiepop and Others – Kotoe Kinugawa
 Star-Myu: High School Star Musical 3 - Yuuki Nayuki
 7 Seeds – Matsuri Tendō

2020
 Kuma Kuma Kuma Bear – Atora

2021
 Hortensia Saga  – Lacroix
 Idoly Pride  – Radio host, leader of Growing July
 Non Non Biyori Nonstop – Komari Koshigaya
 The Way of the Househusband – Yuriko (ep 9)

2022
 Miss Shachiku and the Little Baby Ghost – Ryōko
 Encouragement of Climb: Next Summit – Hinata Kuraue

Anime film
2020
 High School Fleet: The Movie as Minami Kaburagi

Dubbing
 Evil Dead – Teenager

Drama CD
 My Little Monster (Tonari no Kaibutsu-kun) – Yū Miyama
 Ultimate Otaku Teacher (Denpa Kyōshi) – Suzune Kagami
 Etrian Odyssey – Tlachtga/Tsusukuru

Variety shows
 Korenande Shoukai – Madanai

Video games
 Busou Shinki Battle Rondo (2007) – Arnval/Arnval Mk.2
 Rune Factory Frontier (2008) – Anette
 Busou Shinki Battle Masters (2010) – Arnval Mk.2
 Hyperdimension Neptunia series (2010-) – Blanc/White Heart/Next White, Dark White
 Solatorobo (2010) – Chocolat Gelato
 Devil Survivor Overclocked (2011) – Midori Komaki
 Marvel vs. Capcom 3: Fate of Two Worlds (2011) – Felicia
 Ultimate Marvel vs. Capcom 3 (2011) – Felicia
 Otomedius Excellent (2011) – Arnval, Ruby
 Magical Girl Lyrical Nanoha A's Portable: The Gears of Destiny (2011) – Unbreakable Dark, Isis Egret
 Fire Emblem Awakening (2012) – Lissa
 Guilty Crown: Lost Christmas (2012) – Carol
 Phantasy Star Online 2 (2012) – Patty
 Summon Night 5 (2013) – Spinel
 Ren'ai Kilometer Portable (2013) – Moe Osawa
 Shin Sekaiju no Meikyuu: Millennium no Shoujo (2013) – Tsusukuru/Tlachtga
 Devil Survivor 2 Break Record (2015) – Airi Ban
 Guns Girl School Dayz (2015) – Kiana Kaslana (on version 1.3) Bronya Zaychik (on version 1.5)
 Project X Zone 2 (2015) – Felicia
 Island (2016) – Karen Kurutsu 
 Gundam Breaker 3 (2016) – Mochizuki
 Genkai Tokki: Seven Pirates (2016) – Jewel
 Fire Emblem Heroes (2017) – Lissa
 Fate/Grand Order (2017) – Chacha
 Honkai Impact 3rd (2017) – Bronya Zaychik
 Shinobi Master Senran Kagura: New Link (2017) – Fubuki
 Magia Record (2018)– Nagisa Momoe
 Azur Lane (2018) – Blanc/White Heart An shan Fu shun
 Atelier Lulua: The Scion of Arland (2019) – Eva Armster
 Da Capo 4 (2019) – Hiyori Shirakawa
 Another Eden (2019) – Myrus
 Grand Chase Dimensional Chaser (2020) – Io Jupiter
 Arknights (2020) – Snowsant
 Guardian Tales (2020) – Mayreel
 Blue Archive (2021) – Kuda Izuna
 Monster Hunter Rise (2021) – Yomogi the Chef
 Counter:Side (2022) – Sigma
 Honkai: Star Rail (TBA) – Bronya Rand

References

External links
  
  
 

1983 births
Living people
Japanese stage actresses
Japanese video game actresses
Japanese voice actresses
Musicians from Fukuoka Prefecture
Voice actresses from Fukuoka Prefecture
81 Produce voice actors
21st-century Japanese actresses
21st-century Japanese women singers
21st-century Japanese singers